Samuel Lawrence Klausman Parks (December 13, 1914 – April 13, 1975) was an American stage and film actor. His career arced from bit player and supporting roles to top billing, before it was virtually ended when he admitted to having once been a member of a Communist Party cell, which led to his blacklisting by all Hollywood studios. His best known role was Al Jolson, whom he portrayed in two films: The Jolson Story (1946) and Jolson Sings Again (1949).

Life and career
Parks was born in Olathe, Kansas, the son of Nellie (Klausman) and Frank H. Parks. He was raised in his mother's religion of Judaism. He was raised in Joliet, Illinois, and graduated from Joliet Township High School in 1932.

He attended the University of Illinois as a pre-med student, and played in stock companies for a few years. He went to Hollywood at the suggestion of John Garfield, who said a part in a Warner Bros. film called Mama Ravioli was being held for him. The movie was cancelled, but Parks wound up signing a movie contract with Columbia Pictures in 1941.

Supporting player
As did most Columbia contract players, he played supporting roles in higher-budgeted films, and larger roles in B pictures.

Parks could be seen in Mystery Ship (1941) and Harmon of Michigan (1941). He could be seen in the "A" films You Belong to Me (1941) and Three Girls About Town (1941). He could also be seen in Sing for Your Supper (1941), Harvard, Here I Come (1942), Blondie Goes to College (1942), Canal Zone (1942), Alias Boston Blackie (1942), North of the Rockies (1942), Hello, Annapolis (1942), and Submarine Raider (1942).

Parks was also in an A-movie, They All Kissed the Bride (1942) with Joan Crawford. Then he was in war films such as Flight Lieutenant (1942) and Atlantic Convoy (1942). Parks was in A Man's World (1942) and had a bigger part in The Boogie Man Will Get You (1942) with Boris Karloff and Peter Lorre.

Parks had a tiny part in  You Were Never Lovelier (1942). He was in Power of the Press (1943), Reveille with Beverly (1943), Redhead from Manhattan (1943) with Lupe Vélez, First Comes Courage (1943) directed by Dorothy Arzner, and Destroyer (1943) with Glenn Ford.

Parks had bigger parts in Is Everybody Happy? (1943), Deerslayer (1943), The Racket Man (1944), Hey, Rookie (1944), and Jam Session (1944).

Leading man
Parks graduated to leads with The Black Parachute (1944), Stars on Parade (1944), Sergeant Mike (1944), and She's a Sweetheart (1944).

He supported Paul Muni in Counter-Attack (1945). He was in a Western Renegades (1946), with Evelyn Keyes.

When Columbia was preparing a screen biography of Al Jolson, many big-name stars were considered for the title role, including James Cagney and Danny Thomas (both of whom turned it down), but resident contractee Larry Parks was reportedly the first actor to be interviewed. Parks impressed the producers and won the role. At the age of 31, his performance in The Jolson Story (1946) earned him an Academy Award nomination for Best Actor.

Stardom 

Now that Parks was a fully-fledged star, Columbia kept him busy in elaborate productions. He appeared opposite the studio's biggest star, Rita Hayworth, in Down to Earth (1947).  That year, exhibitors voted him the 15th-biggest star in the US.

Then, he made some swashbucklers, The Swordsman (1948) and The Gallant Blade (1948). Parks tried to break his contract with Columbia in 1948, but was unsuccessful. That year he criticised the  House Un-American Activities Committee (HUAC).

He made Jolson Sings Again (1949), which was another huge box-office hit. His co-star in the film, Barbara Hale, teamed with him again in the comedy feature Emergency Wedding (1950). In 1950 he and his wife announced plans to make their own film Stakeout. British exhibitors voted him the 9th-most popular star in the UK.

Blacklisting
In 1951, Parks was summoned to appear before the HUAC under threat of being blacklisted in the movie industry, but he begged not to be forced to testify. He eventually did so in tears, only to be blacklisted anyway. Parks eventually gave up the names of his former colleagues to the committee.

Following his admission before the committee, Columbia Pictures dropped him from his contract, although it had four years to run, and Parks had been set to star in the film Small Wonder (which later became The First Time). At the time, Parks' fee was $75,000 a film. A romantic comedy he made for MGM, Love Is Better Than Ever, was shelved for a year.

He made a TV film for The Ford Television Theatre in 1953 and starred in the British film Tiger by the Tail (1955) in England.

He continued to squeeze out a living acting on the stage and doing occasional television programs. His last appearance in a major role was in the John Huston film, Freud: The Secret Passion (1962).

Later career
Parks eventually left the film industry and formed a successful construction business. Eventually, he and his wife, Betty Garrett, owned many apartment buildings scattered throughout the Los Angeles metropolitan area. Rather than sell them upon completion, Parks decided to retain ownership and collect rents as a landlord, a decision that proved to be extremely profitable. During that period, the couple occasionally performed in Las Vegas showrooms, summer stock productions, and touring companies of Broadway shows.

Personal life
Parks married actress Betty Garrett in 1944. She starred in Hollywood films such as On the Town and on television as Archie Bunker's neighbor Irene Lorenzo on All in the Family and as landlady Edna Babish on Laverne and Shirley. Her career also faced turmoil as a result of her marriage to Parks, and the two spent much of the 1950s doing theatre and musical variety shows. Together, they had two sons, actor Andrew Parks and composer Garrett Parks. Larry Parks was also godfather to actor Jeff Bridges.

A Democrat, he supported Adlai Stevenson's campaign in the 1952 presidential election.

Parks died of a heart attack in 1975 at the age of 60.

Filmography

 Mystery Ship (1941) as Tommy Baker 
 Harmon of Michigan (1941) as Harvey
 You Belong to Me (1941) as Blemish (uncredited)
 Three Girls About Town (1941) as Reporter
 Sing for Your Supper (1941) as Mickey (uncredited)
 Honolulu Lu (1941) as Sailor (uncredited)
 Harvard, Here I Come! (1941) as Eddie Spellman
 Blondie Goes to College (1942) as Rusty Bryant
 Canal Zone (1942) as Recruit Kincaid
 Alias Boston Blackie (1942) as Joe Trilby
 North of the Rockies (1942) as Jim Bailey
 Hello, Annapolis (1942) as Paul Herbert
 Submarine Raider (1942) as Sparksie
 They All Kissed the Bride (1942) as Joe Krim (uncredited)
 Flight Lieutenant (1942) as Cadet Sandy Roth (uncredited)
 Atlantic Convoy (1942) as Gregory
 A Man's World (1942) as Chick O'Driscoll
 The Boogie Man Will Get You (1942) as Bill Layden
 You Were Never Lovelier (1942) as Tony (uncredited)
 Power of the Press (1943) as Jerry Purvis (uncredited)
 Reveille with Beverly (1943) as Eddie Ross
 Redhead from Manhattan (1943) as Flirt (uncredited)
 First Comes Courage (1943) as Capt. Langdon (uncredited)
 Destroyer (1943) as Ens. Johnson (uncredited)
 Is Everybody Happy? (1943) as Jerry Stewart
 The Deerslayer (1943) as Jingo-Good
 The Racket Man (1944) as Larry Lake
 Hey, Rookie (1944) as Jim Leighter
 Jam Session (1944) as Actor at Superba Pictures (uncredited)
 The Black Parachute (1944) as Michael Kaligor Lindley
 Stars on Parade (1944) as Danny Davis
 Sergeant Mike (1944) as Pvt. Tom Allen
 She's a Sweetheart (1944) as Rocky Hill
 Counter-Attack (1945) as Kirichenko
 Renegades (1946) as Ben Dembrow (Ben Taylor)
 The Jolson Story (1946) as Al Jolson
 Down to Earth (1947) as Danny Miller
 Her Husband's Affairs (1947) as himself (uncredited)
 The Swordsman (1948) as Alexander MacArden
 The Gallant Blade (1948) as Lt. David Picard
 Jolson Sings Again (1949) as Al Jolson
 Emergency Wedding (1950) as Peter Judson Kirk Jr.
 Love Is Better Than Ever (1952) as Jud Parker
 Tiger by the Tail (1954, UK) as John Desmond 
 Freud: The Secret Passion (1962, UK) as Dr. Joseph Breuer (final film role)

Television

References

External links
 
 Video: The Jolson Story compilation of film clips
 Photographs and literature

1914 births
1975 deaths
20th-century American Jews
20th-century American male actors
Actors from Joliet, Illinois
American male film actors
American male stage actors
California Democrats
Columbia Pictures contract players
Hollywood blacklist
Illinois Democrats
Jewish American male actors
Male actors from Illinois
Male actors from Kansas
Members of the Communist Party USA
People from Olathe, Kansas
University of Illinois Urbana-Champaign alumni